Lectionary 1619, or ℓ 1619 in the Gregory-Aland numbering is a Greek minuscule manuscript of the New Testament, written on 312 parchment leaves (19.4 cm by 13.7 cm). Paleographically it had been assigned to the 17th century.

Description 

The codex contains Lessons from the Gospels. It is a lectionary (Evangelistarium). The text is written in one column per page, 27 lines per page.

History 

Place of the provenance - Venice. In 1933 it was purchased in London for Duke University. Currently it forms part of the Kenneth Willis Clark Collection of Greek Manuscripts in the David M. Rubenstein Rare Book & manuscript Library of Duke University (Greek MS 2) in Durham, North Carolina.

See also 

 List of New Testament lectionaries 
 Textual criticism

References

Further reading

External links 
 Lectionary 1619 at the Kenneth Willis Clark Collection of Greek Manuscripts

Greek New Testament lectionaries
Greek-Coptic diglot manuscripts of the New Testament
17th-century biblical manuscripts
Duke University Libraries